The 16th Annual Latin Grammy Awards were held on November 19, 2015 at the MGM Grand Garden Arena in Paradise. This  is the second time that Latin Grammys will be held at this location, will be broadcast live on the Univision Network from 8–11 p.m. ET/PT (7 p.m. Central).

The nominations were announced on September 23, 2015. Leonel García leads with six nominations, followed by Natalia Lafourcade with five. Additionally, Juan Luis Guerra and Alejandro Sanz; engineers Edgar Barrera, Demián Nava, and Alan Saucedo; and producer Cachorro López each receive four nominations. Pablo Alborán, Miguel Bosé, Café Quijano, Pedro Capó, Nicky Jam, Ricky Martin, and Vicentico are among those who each receive three nominations. Brazilian singer Roberto Carlos will be honored as the Latin Recording Academy Person of the Year on November 18, the day prior to the Latin Grammy Awards.

Performers

Awards
The following is the list of nominees.

General
Record of the Year
Natalia Lafourcade — "Hasta la Raíz"
 Bomba Estéreo — "Fiesta"
 Miguel Bosé — "Encanto"
 Café Quijano — "Será (Vida de Hombre)"
 Camila featuring Marco Antonio Solís — "La Vida Entera"
 Leonel García featuring Jorge Drexler — "Ella Es"
 Juan Luis Guerra 4.40 — "Tus Besos"
 Ricky Martin — "Disparo al Corazón"
 Alejandro Sanz — "Un Zombie a la Intemperie"
 Julieta Venegas — "Ese Camino"

Album of the Year
Juan Luis Guerra 4.40 — Todo Tiene Su Hora
 Pepe Aguilar — MTV Unplugged
 Rubén Blades and Roberto Delgado & Orquesta — Son de Panamá
 Miguel Bosé — Amo
 Café Quijano — Orígenes: El Bolero Volumen 3
 Natalia Jiménez — Creo en Mí
 Natalia Lafourcade — Hasta la Raíz
 Monsieur Periné — Caja de Música
 Alejandro Sanz — Sirope
 María Toledo — ConSentido

Song of the Year
Leonel García and Natalia Lafourcade — "Hasta la Raíz" (Lafourcade)
 Pedro Capó, Yoel Henríquez, Ricky Martin and Rafael Esparza Ruiz — "Disparo al Corazón" (Ricky Martin)
 Julieta Venegas — "Ese Camino"
 Beatriz Luengo, Antonio Rayo Gibo, Yotuel Romero and Diego Torres — "Hoy Es Domingo" (Diego Torres)
 Pablo Alborán — "Por Fin"
 Claudia Brant and Natalia Jiménez — "Quédate Con Ella" (Natalia Jiménez)
 Leonel García — "¿Recuerdas?"
 Alejandro Sanz — "Un Zombie a la Intemperie"
 Gian Marco — "Vida de Mi Vida"
 Pedro Capó — "Vivo"

Best New Artist
Monsieur Periné
Kaay
Iván "Melón" Lewis
Manu Manzo
Matisse
Julieta Rada
Tulipa Ruiz
Raquel Sofía
Vazquez Sounds
Vitrola Sintética

Pop
Best Contemporary Pop Vocal Album
Alejandro Sanz — Sirope
 Pablo Alborán — Terral
 Miguel Bosé — Amo
 Pedro Capó — Aquila
 Ricky Martin — A Quien Quiera Escuchar

Best Traditional Pop Vocal Album
Gilberto Santa Rosa — Necesito Un Bolero
 Astrid Asher — Astrid Asher
 Café Quijano — Orígenes: El Bolero Volumen 3
 Mojito Lite — Nada Es Demasiado
 Vicentico — Último Acto

Urban
Best Urban Performance
Nicky Jam and Enrique Iglesias — "El Perdón"
 Alexis & Fido — "A Ti Te Encanta"
 Alkilados featuring J Alvarez, El Roockie and Nicky Jam — "Una Cita (Remix)"
 J Balvin — "Ay Vamos"
 Maluma — "El Tiki"
 Yandel — "Calentura"
 Daddy Yankee — "Sígueme Y Te Sigo"

Best Urban Music Album
Tego Calderón — El Que Sabe, Sabe
 Farruko — Farruko Presenta: Los Menores
 Nicky Jam — Greatest Hits Vol 1
 Don Omar — The Last Don 2
 Yandel — Legacy: De Lider a Leyenda Tour (Deluxe Edition)

Best Urban Song
J Balvin, Rene Cano, Alejandro "Mosty" Patiño and Alejandro "Sky" Ramírez — "Ay Vamos" (J Balvin)
 Alexis & Fido and Juan Jesús Santana — "A Ti Te Encanta" (Alexis & Fido)
 Ilya, Savan Kotecha, Pitbull and Prince Royce  — "Back It Up (Spanish Version)" (Prince Royce featuring Jennifer Lopez and Pitbull)
 Tego Calderón and Ernesto Padilla — "Dando Break" (Tego Calderón)
 Carlos Ortiz, Luis Ortiz and Daddy Yankee — "Sígueme Y Te Sigo" (Daddy Yankee)

Rock
Best Rock Album
Diamante Eléctrico — B
 Charliepapa — Y/O
 Cuca — La Venganza De Cucamonga
 La Gusana Ciega — Monarca
 No Te Va Gustar — El Tiempo Otra Vez Avanza

Best Pop/Rock Album
Maná — Cama Incendiada
 El Cuarteto de Nos — Habla Tu Espejo
 Mikel Erentxun — Corazones
 Manolo García — Todo Es Ahora
 Camila Luna — Flamboyán
 Moderatto — Malditos Pecadores

Best Rock Song
Cachorro López and Vicentico — "Esclavo de Tu Amor" (Vicentico)
 Charliepapa — "Astrómetra"
 Daniel Aceves and Jotdog — "Celebración" (Jotdog)
 Adolfo Cabrales and Carlos Raya — "Entre La Espada y La Pared" (Fito & Fitipaldis)
 Daniel Álvarez and Juan Galeano — "Todo Va A Arder" (Diamante Eléctrico)

Alternative
Best Alternative Music Album
Natalia Lafourcade — Hasta la Raíz
 Bomba Estéreo — Amanecer
 Centavrvs — Sombras de Oro
 Los Auténticos Decadentes — Y La Banda Sigue
 Porter — Moctezuma

Best Alternative Song
Leonel García and Natalia Lafourcade — "Hasta la Raíz" (Lafourcade)
 Famasloop — "Allí Estás"
 Andrés Nusser — "Caribbean" (Astro)
 Roberto Musso — "No Llora" (El Cuarteto de Nos)
 Javiera Mena — "Otra Era"

Tropical
Best Salsa Album
Rubén Blades with Roberto Delgado and Orquesta — Son de Panamá
 Luis Enrique — Jukebox Primera Edición
 Víctor Manuelle — Que Suenen los Tambores
 Ismael Miranda — Son 45
 Rey Ruiz — Estaciones

Best Cumbia/Vallenato Album
Jorge Celedón and Gustavo García — Sencillamente
 Américo — Por Siempre
 Silvestre Dangond and Lucas Dangond — Sigo Invicto
 Gusi — Al Son de Mi Corazón
 Iván Villazón and Saúl Lallemand — El Camino de Mi Existencia

Best Contemporary Tropical Album
Juan Luis Guerra 4.40 — Todo Tiene Su Hora
 Lucas Arnau — Buen Camino
 Leslie Grace — Lloviendo Estrellas
 Guaco — Presente Continuo
 Johnny Sky — Johnny Sky

Best Traditional Tropical Album
José Alberto "El Canario" and Septeto Santiaguero — Tributo A Los Compadres No Quiero Llanto
 Checo Acosta — #SiguedeModa
 Rafael "Pollo" Brito — Homenaje A Tito Rodríguez
 Alain Pérez — El Alma del Son – Tributo A Matamoros
 Sonlokos — Locos Por El Son

Best Tropical Fusion Album
ChocQuibTown — El Mismo
 Chino & Nacho — Radio Universo
 Daiquiri — Esa Morena
 Juan Magan — The King is Back
 Jorge Villamizar — El Día Que Vuelva

Best Tropical Song
Juan Luis Guerra — "Tus Besos"
  Andrés Castro and Víctor Manuelle — "Agua Bendita" (Víctor Manuelle)
 Edgar Barrera, Efraín Dávila, Guianko Gómez and Leslie Grace — "Cómo Duele El Silencio" (Leslie Grace)
 Gusi — "Tú Tienes Razón (Bachata)"
 Alex Cuba, Luis Enrique and Fernando Osorio — "Ya Comenzó" (Luis Enrique)

Singer-songwriter
Best Singer-Songwriter Album
Alex Cuba — Healer
 Santiago Cruz — Equilibrio
 Leonel García — Amor Futuro
 Marta Gómez — Este Instante
 Gian Marco — #Libre

Regional Mexican
Best Ranchero Album
Pedro Fernández — Acaríciame El Corazón
 Aida Cuevas — Pa' Que Sientas Lo Que Siento
 Mariachi Flor de Toloache — Mariachi Flor de Toloache
 Mariachi Los Arrieros del Valle — Alegría del Mariachi
 Diego Verdaguer — Mexicano Hasta Las Pampas 2

Best Banda Album
Banda El Recodo de Don Cruz Lizarraga — Mi Vicio Mas Grande
 Julión Álvarez y Su Norteño Banda — El Aferrado
 Banda Rancho Viejo — Dejando Huella
 El Coyote y Su Banda Tierra Santa — Alucine
 La Arrolladora Banda El Limón de René Camacho — Ojos En Blanco

Best Tejano Album
Sólido — Sentimientos
 Alazzan — Tributo Al Amor y Dolor
 La Fiebre — Nueva Era
 Los Gallitos — Dueña de Mi Amor
 Ruben Ramos and the Mexican Revolution — El Ídolo de Tejas
 Elida Reyna and Avante — Al Fin Completa

Best Norteño Album
Pesado — Abrázame
 Ariel Camacho y Los Plebes del Rancho — El Karma
 La Energía Norteña — Cruzando Territorio
 Remmy Valenzuela — Mi Vida En Vida
 Voz de Mando — Levantando Polvadera

Best Regional Song
Mauricio Arriaga, Edgar Barrera and Eduardo Murguía — "Todo Tuyo" (Banda El Recodo de Cruz Lizárraga)
 Julio Bahumea — "El Amor De Su Vida" (Julión Álvarez y Su Norteño Banda)
 José Alberto Inzunza and Luciano Luna — "Me Sobrabas Tú" (Banda Los Recoditos)
 Raúl Jiménez E. and Chucho Rincón — "Para Que Nunca Llores" (Diego Verdaguer)
 Espinoza Paz — "Perdí La Pose"

Instrumental
Best Instrumental Album
Ed Calle and Mamblue — Dr. Ed Calle Presents Mamblue
 Antonio Adolfo — Tema
 Chick Corea Trio — Triology
 Kenny G — Brazilian Nights
 Gustavo Santaolalla — Camino

Traditional
Best Folk Album
Lila Downs — Balas y Chocolate
 Reynaldo Armas — La Muerte del Rucio Moro
 Ciro Hurtado — Ayahuasca Dreams
 Los Tekis — Hijos de La Tierra
 Teresa Parodi — 30 Años + 5 Días

Best Tango Album
Orquesta del Tango de Buenos Aires — Homenaje A Astor Piazzolla
 Ariel Ardit — Aníbal Troilo 100 Años
 Octavio Brunetti and Elmira Darvarova — Piazzolla: Desde Estudios A Tangos
 Quinteto Leopoldo Federico — Bogotá - Buenos Aires
 Berta Rojas and Camerata Bariloche — Historia Del Tango - History Of Tango
 Selección Nacional de Tango — Troilo 100 Años

Best Flamenco Album
Various Artists — Entre 20 Aguas: A La Música de Paco de Lucía
 Joselito Acedo — Andando
 Argentina — Sinergia
 Blas Córdoba "El Kejío" and Chano Domínguez — Bendito
 Estrella Morente & Niño Josele — Amar En Paz
 Miguel Poveda — Sonetos Y Poemas Para La Libertad
 María Toledo — conSentido

Jazz
Best Latin Jazz Album
Paquito D'Rivera — Jazz Meets The Classics
 Eddie Fernández — Jazzeando
 Iván "Melón" Lewis — Ayer Y Hoy
 José Negroni — Negroni Piano +9
 José Valentino Ruiz and the Latin Jazz Ensemble featuring Giovanni Hidalgo — I Make You Want To Move

Christian
Best Christian Album (Spanish Language)
Alex Campos — Derroche de Amor
 Marco Barrientos — Amanece
 Emmanuel Y Linda — Voy Tras de Ti con Todo
 Son by Four — Mujer Frente a La Cruz
 Tercer Cielo — Irreversible

Best Christian Album (Portuguese Language)
Fernanda Brum — Da Eternidade
 Anderson Freire — Ao Vivo
 Jane Gomes — Posso Tudo Nele
 Bruna Karla — Como Águia
 Wilian Nascimento — Não Vou Desistir

Brazilian
Best Brazilian Contemporary Pop Album
Tulipa Ruiz — Dancê
 Jamz — Insano
 Seu Jorge — Músicas Para Churrasco Vol. 2
 Onze:20 — Vida Loka
 Jonas Sá — Blam! Blam!

Best Brazilian Rock Album
Suricato — Sol-Te
 Banda do Mar — Banda do Mar
 Humberto Gessinger — Insular Ao Vivo
 Malta — Supernova
 Pato Fu — Não Pare Pra Pensar

Best Samba/Pagode Album
Fundo de Quintal — Só Felicidade
 Nilze Carvalho — Verde Amarelo Negro Anil
 Arlindo Cruz — Herança Popular
 Mart'nália — Em Samba! Ao Vivo
 Diogo Nogueira and Hamilton de Holanda — Bossa Negra
 Zeca Pagodinho — Ser Humano
 Sorriso Maroto — Sorriso Eu Gosto - Ao Vivo No Maracanãzinho

Best MPB Album
Ivan Lins — América, Brasil
 Maria Bethânia — Meus Quintais
 Dorival Caymmi — Centenário Caymmi
 Maria Gadú — Guelã
 Lenine — Carbono

Best Sertaneja Music Album
Renato Teixeira and Sérgio Reis — Amizade Sincera II
 Jorge & Mateus — Os Anjos Cantam
 Leonardo & Eduardo Costa — Cabaré
 Michel Teló — Bem Sertanejo
 Victor & Leo — Irmãos

Best Brazilian Song
Hamilton de Holanda, Diogo Nogueira and Marcos Portinari — "Bossa Negra" (Diogo Nogueira and Hamilton de Holanda)
 Bruno Boncini — "Diz Pra Mim" (Malta)
 Mallu Magalhães — "Mais Ninguém" (Banda do Mar)
 Dudu Falcão and Lenine — "Simples Assim" (Lenine)
 Adriana Calcanhotto and Bebel Gilberto — "Tudo" (Bebel Gilberto)

Children's
Best Latin Children’s Album
Mister G — Los Animales
 Chino & Nacho — Chino & Nacho for Babies
Lucky Díaz and the Family Jam Band — Adelante
 Rockcito — De La Cuna A La Jungla
 123 Andrés — ¡Uno, Dos, Tres, Andrés! En Español y En Inglés

Classical
Best Classical Album
Débora Halász, Franz Halász and Radamés Gnattali — Alma Brasileira
José Serebrier — Dvorak-Serebrier Legends: Symphony No. 8no Concerto No. 2, Op. 18 - Montero: Ex Patria, Op. 1 & Improvisations Fernando Otero — Ritual Cuarteto Latinoamericano — Ruperto Chapí: String Quartets 1&2 Iván Valiente — Works For String OrchestraBest Classical Contemporary Composition
Carlos Franzetti — "Capriccio" (Allison Brewster Franzetti)
 José Serebrier conducting the Málaga Philharmonic and the FIU Concert Choir — "Auschwitz (Nunca Se Olvidarán)" (Orlando Jacinto García)
 Miguel del Águila — "Concierto En Tango Op. 110 For Cello And Orchestra" (JoAnn Falletta conducting the Buffalo Philharmonic Orchestra)
 Fernando Otero — "Conexión"
 Yalil Guerra — "El Retrato de La Paloma" (Iván Valiente conducting the Ensamble Solistas de La Habana) 
 Roberto Sierra — "Trio No. 4 "La Noche"" (Arcos Trío)

Recording Package
Best Recording Package
Natalia Ayala, Carlos Dussan Gómez and Juliana Jaramillo — Este Instante (Marta Gómez)
 Julia Rocha — Blam! Blam! (Jonas Sá)
 Anna Amendola — Noel Rosa, Preto E Branco (Valéria Lobão)
 Pablo González and Francisca Valenzuela — Tajo Abierto (Francisca Valenzuela)
 Laura Varsky — Veinte Años El Grito Después (Catupecu Machu)

Production
Best Engineered Album
Andrés Borda, Eduardo del Águila, Demián Nava, Alan Ortiz Grande, Alan Saucedo, Sebastián Schunt, Cesar Sogbe and José Blanco — Hasta la Raíz (Natalia Lafourcade)
 Salome Limón and Caco Refojo — Astrid Asher (Astrid Asher)
 Daniel Musy, Daniel Musy and Andre Dias — Baile do Almeidinha (Hamilton de Holanda)
 Jonathan Allen, Rodrigo de Castro Lopes, Pete Karam and Paul Blakemore — Made in Brazil (Eliane Elias)
 Otávio Carvalho and Felipe Tichauer — Sintético (Vitrola Sintética)

Producer of the Year
Sebastian Krys
 Mario Adnet and Dori Caymmi
 Aníbal Kerpel and Gustavo Santaolalla
 George Noriega
 Kenny O'brien and Manuel Quijano
 Andrés Saavedra

Music video
Best Short Form Music Video
Calle 13 featuring Silvio Rodríguez — "Ojos Color Sol"
 Willbert Álvarez — "Te Busqué"
 Calle 13 — "Así de Grandes Son las Ideas"
 El Cuarteto de Nos — "No Llora"
 Porter — "Huitzil"

Best Long Form Music Video
Juanes — Loco de Amor: La Historia
 Pablo Alborán — Terral Kinky — MTV Unplugged Ara Malikian — 15 Vicentico — Último Acto''

Special Merit Awards
The following is a list of special merit awards 

Lifetime Achievement Awards
 Gato Barbieri
 Ana Belén and Víctor Manuel
 Angela Carrasco
 Djavan
 El Gran Combo de Puerto Rico
 Pablo Milanés

Trustees Award
 Federico Britos
 Humberto Gatica
 Chelique Sarabia

Changes to award categories
Due to the low number of entries, the Best Brazilian Roots Album category was not awarded this year.

References

External links
Official Site

Latin Grammy Awards
Latin Grammy Awards by year
Annual Latin Grammy Awards
Grammy Awards
Annual Latin Grammy Awards
Latin Grammy Awards, 16